Prusa may refer to:

 Prusa i3, a 3D printer
 Prūsa, the name for Prussia in Old Prussian
 Prusa (Bithynia), ancient city of Anatolia
 Prusias ad Mare, ancient city of Anatolia

See also 
 Prusac, a village in Bosnia and Herzegovina
 Prusak, a village in Łódź Voivodeship, Poland
 Prusias (disambiguation)